Life is a 2017 American science fiction horror film directed by Daniel Espinosa, written by Rhett Reese and Paul Wernick and starring an ensemble cast consisting of Jake Gyllenhaal, Ryan Reynolds, Rebecca Ferguson, Hiroyuki Sanada, Ariyon Bakare and Olga Dihovichnaya. In the film, a six-member crew of the International Space Station uncovers the first evidence of extraterrestrial life on Mars. When members of the crew conduct their research, the rapidly evolving life-form proves far more intelligent and terrifying.

The development of Life began in November 2015, when Espinosa would direct a film set in space, with Wernick and Reese writing the screenplay. After the deal with Paramount Pictures was not confirmed, Sony Pictures signed on to handle the worldwide distribution rights and co-finance the film, with Skydance in March 2016. The casting call took place in January 2016, and filming took place in France, New York City and Vietnam between February and July. The visual effects were handled by DNEG, Industrial Light & Magic, NVIZIBLE, One of Us, Outpost VFX and Atomic Fiction.

The only co-production between Skydance Media and Sony Pictures, the film had its world premiere at South by Southwest on March 18, 2017, and was theatrically released in the United States by Columbia Pictures on March 24, 2017. It received mostly positive reviews, with praise for its acting, visuals and screenplay, but was compared unfavorably with films like Alien (1979). The film grossed over $100 million worldwide against a $58 million budget.

Plot

In the near future, an unmanned space probe returns from Mars to Earth orbit with soil samples potentially containing evidence of extraterrestrial life. The probe is intercepted by the International Space Station. From its samples, exobiologist Hugh Derry revives a dormant cell that quickly grows into a multi-celled organism that US schoolchildren name "Calvin". Hugh realizes that Calvin's cells can change their specialization, acting as muscle, neuron, and photosensory cells all at once.

During an experiment, Calvin becomes hostile, wrapping itself around Hugh's hand and crushing it. Calvin then escapes its enclosure and devours a lab rat, growing in size. Engineer Rory Adams rescues Hugh, but Calvin grabs onto his leg, prompting physician David Jordan to lock Rory in the lab. After Rory unsuccessfully attempts to destroy Calvin with a flame-throwing incinerator, Calvin enters his mouth, devouring his internal organs and killing him. After several minutes, Calvin emerges from Rory's mouth, larger than before, and escapes the lab through a fire-control vent.

The crew attempts to inform Earth of the situation, but the station's communication system overheats, cutting off contact with Earth. ISS commander Ekaterina "Kat" Golovkina performs a spacewalk to find and fix the problem, which turns out to be Calvin. Calvin attacks Kat and ruptures her spacesuit's coolant system. As her suit fills with coolant, Kat makes her way to the airlock. She and the crew realize that Calvin will re-enter the station if they let her in, so she chooses to stay outside, and drowns in her spacesuit.

Calvin attempts to re-enter the station through its maneuvering thrusters. The crew fire the thrusters to blast it away, but they drain so much fuel that it causes the ISS to enter a decaying orbit, where it will burn up in Earth's atmosphere. Pilot Sho Murakami suggests using the ISS's remaining fuel to get back into a safe orbit even though it will allow Calvin to re-enter. The crew seal themselves in one side of the station and prepare to vent the atmosphere from the other side to render Calvin dormant. Hugh spots Calvin while the crew is working but chooses not to report the creature. At some point, Calvin latches on to his leg and begins feeding off him before the crew finishes sealing off the section where Calvin is supposed to be contained. The crew discovers Calvin feeding off of Hugh after he unexpectedly dies. Calvin attacks the crew, forcing them to flee. Sho seals himself inside a sleeping pod, while Calvin tries to break inside. David and Quarantine Officer Miranda North use Hugh's corpse as bait to lure Calvin away and trap it.

Having received a distress call prior to the damage to the ISS communication system, Earth sends a Soyuz spacecraft to push the station into deep space. This is a fail-safe to protect Earth, but Sho believes this to be a rescue and boards the Soyuz. He is followed by Calvin, who kills the Soyuz crew. A docking breach occurs, and Sho sacrifices himself in an unsuccessful attempt to trap Calvin in the Soyuz. The Soyuz detaches and crashes into the ISS, causing the ISS's orbit to decay again.

The remaining survivors, David and Miranda, speculate that Calvin could survive re-entry into Earth's atmosphere, so they plan to lure Calvin into one of the ISS' two escape pods. Once inside, David will manually pilot the pod containing Calvin into deep space, thereby isolating it and enabling Miranda to return to Earth in the other pod. David leads Calvin into his pod and launches into space as Miranda launches her pod, and the two pods go in different directions. As Miranda's pod flies in one direction, she records a black box message to warn Earth of Calvin's threat. Subsequently, one pod is hit by debris, while David is attacked by Calvin while trying to pilot. Eventually, one of the two pods lands in the sea and is found by Vietnamese fishermen, while the other pod flies away from Earth. What the Vietnamese fishermen find turns out to be David's pod. Meanwhile, Miranda's pod flies uncontrollably into deep space. On Earth, the fishermen open David's pod despite his warnings, as other boats arrive at the scene.

Cast 
 Jake Gyllenhaal as Dr. David Jordan, USA, ISS medical officer.
 Ryan Reynolds as Rory Adams, USA, ISS engineer.
 Rebecca Ferguson as Dr. Miranda North, UK, CDC quarantine officer.
 Hiroyuki Sanada as Sho Murakami, Japan, ISS systems engineer.
 Ariyon Bakare as Dr. Hugh Derry, UK, ISS exobiologist.
 Olga Dihovichnaya as Ekaterina "Kat" Golovkina, Russia, ISS Mission Commander.
 Naoko Mori as Kazumi, Sho Murakami's wife.

Production 
On November 18, 2015, Deadline Hollywood reported that Daniel Espinosa would direct a film set in space and titled Life, from a script from Paul Wernick and Rhett Reese, which Skydance Media financing and producing, with David Ellison, Dana Goldberg, Bonnie Curtis, and Julie Lynn. Paramount Pictures was circling to handle the distribution rights to the film, though the deal was not confirmed. On January 28, 2016, Rebecca Ferguson came on board to star in the film, and Ryan Reynolds subsequently joined, on February 16, 2016. On March 10, 2016, Jake Gyllenhaal was cast in the film. On March 15, 2016, Sony Pictures signed on to handle the worldwide distribution rights and co-finance the film, with Skydance. On June 23, 2016, Hiroyuki Sanada was cast to play one of the members of the International Space Station crew, and on July 19, 2016, The Hollywood Reporter wrote that Olga Dihovichnaya and Ariyon Bakare were also cast in the film, playing other crew members. One scene in the trailer for the film features a recycled shot from the 2007 movie, Spider-Man 3.

Principal photography on the film began at London's Shepperton Studios on July 19, 2016. To emulate the lack of gravity, the actors were suspended by wires that were erased in post-production. Most of the visual effects were handled by Double Negative, aside from the eight-minute long take that opens the movie, done by Industrial Light & Magic using the ISS model sculpted by Double Negative. That scene was described by Daniel Espinosa as "the inverse version of Gravity. Gravity looks at the vastness of space through the oner. I wanted to look at the claustrophobia." Espinosa said that Life was "shot to make a science fiction movie that ties into this other great American genre, which is noir", with the death of the most charismatic character that seems to be the protagonist—using Psycho as an example, Espinosa explained that "Ryan [Reynolds] became my Janet Leigh"—and a downer ending.

Composer Jon Ekstrand wrote his sixth score while working with Espinosa. Ekstrand aimed to create an "atonal-horror score with some melodic elements", mostly focused on orchestral music while opening with "more melodic and classical cinematic" tones to not give away the horror trappings early on. Espinosa specifically told Ekstrand to seek a sound reminiscent of Bernard Herrmann, with some influence from György Ligeti to reference the music from 2001: A Space Odyssey.

Release 
Life was released by Columbia Pictures on March 24, 2017, after being moved up from its previously announced release date of May 26, 2017, to avoid competition with Pirates of the Caribbean: Dead Men Tell No Tales and Alien: Covenant, the latter of which had moved up its release date from August 4, 2017 to May 19, 2017. Life had its world premiere at South by Southwest on March 18, 2017.

Marketing 
In March 2017, it was noted that stock footage of a crowd reacting to Spider-Man catching Gwen Stacy from Spider-Man 3s B-roll was used in a trailer for Life. This announcement led to theories that Life was secretly an origin story for the symbiote featured in Spider-Man 3, a theory made more popular by the announcement of a Venom film shortly afterwards, and that Lifes screenwriters, Rhett Reese and Paul Wernick, had previously written a Venom script. When asked about the rumour in a Collider interview, Daniel Espinosa confirmed that he was a fan of Venom. Jake Gyllenhaal would later portray Mysterio in the 2019 Marvel Cinematic Universe film Spider-Man: Far From Home. Espinosa would later go on to direct Morbius, based on the Spider-Man character of the same name. On February 2017, Skydance Interactive announced a VR tie-in promo to the film along with their first game Archangel.

Reception

Box office
Life grossed $30.2 million in the United States and Canada and $70.3 million in other territories for a worldwide gross of $100.5 million, against a production budget of $58 million.

In North America, Life opened alongside Power Rangers, CHiPs, and Wilson, and was projected to gross $12–17 million from 3,146 theaters during its opening weekend. It ended up debuting to $12.6 million, finishing 4th at the box office, behind Beauty and the Beast, Power Rangers, and Kong: Skull Island. In its second weekend, the film grossed $5.5 million, dropping to 8th at the box office.

Critical response
On review aggregation website Rotten Tomatoes, the film has an approval rating of 67% based on 237 reviews, with an average rating of 6/10. The site's critical consensus reads, "Life is just thrilling, well-acted, and capably filmed enough to overcome an overall inability to add new wrinkles to the trapped-in-space genre." On Metacritic, the film has a weighted average score of 54 out of 100, based on reviews from 44 critics, indicating "mixed or average reviews". Audiences polled by CinemaScore gave the film an average grade of "C+" on an A+ to F scale, while PostTrak reported just 48% of audience members gave the film a "definite recommend".

Joe Morgenstern of The Wall Street Journal said of the film, "For all its flashy trappings, weighty ruminations and zero-gravity floatings aboard the International Space Station, Life turns out to be another variant of Alien, though without the grungy horror and grim fun. In space no one can hear you snore." Describing the theme of outer space, Ben Kenigsberg of The New York Times said "As the astronauts contend with airlocks, busted equipment and escape pods, it becomes increasingly difficult to pretend that this isn't territory where more inventive screenwriters and stronger visual stylists have gone before." Peter Travers of Rolling Stone faulted not the scenes but the performances, saying there was "not a single actor in Life who manages to fill in and humanize the blank space where a character should be."

Michael O'Sullivan of The Washington Post approved of these character flaws, saying the "conflicting dynamics of their individual temperaments lead occasionally to poor decision-making. While this may be bad for their health, it's great for the movie," adding that "Life has cool effects, real suspense and a sweet twist. It ain't rocket science, but it does what it does well—even, one might say, with a kind of genius." Richard Brody of The New Yorker complimented this balance of character and plot from the director, saying "Espinosa's sense of drama is efficient, familiar, and narrow; if there's a moral sentiment to his direction, it's precisely in the limits that he imposes on the movie's dose of pain and gore." Kenneth Turan of the Los Angeles Times opined that Life, with a mise-en-scène of the International Space Station, was "a wonderful setting for a meal we've tasted before," adding that it is "undeniably satisfying to be in the hands of a persuasive director who knows how to slowly ratchet up the tension to a properly unnerving level."

Empire summarized their review as "Part Alien, part Gravity, just not as good as either of them. But Life whips along at a decent pace and deploys enough engaging action sequences to make it work."

The survivors' reading of Margaret Wise Brown's children's bedtime story Goodnight Moon drew criticism from Peter Bradshaw and Wendy Ide on The Guardian and Hunter Harris on Vulture.com.

Accolades

See also

 List of American films of 2017
 List of films featuring extraterrestrials
 List of films featuring space stations
 List of science fiction horror films

References

External links 

 
 
 
 
 
 

2017 films
2017 horror films
2010s adventure films
2010s science fiction horror films
2010s monster movies
2017 horror thriller films
American science fiction adventure films
American science fiction horror films
American science fiction thriller films
American adventure thriller films
American horror thriller films
American space adventure films
Adventure horror films
2010s English-language films
Films about astronauts
Films about extraterrestrial life
Films directed by Daniel Espinosa
Films scored by Jon Ekstrand
Films shot at Shepperton Studios
Mars in film
Skydance Media films
Columbia Pictures films
Films with screenplays by Paul Wernick
Films with screenplays by Rhett Reese
2010s American films